Ruben Grijalva is a former director of the California Department of Forestry and Fire Protection, appointed in 2006. He received some media attention during the California wildfires of October 2007. In one press report, he asserted that state agencies had done all they could to send useful resources to battle the wildfires.  He resigned from the position in February 2009 and went to work as a private consultant.

Previously while serving as a Public Safety Officer with the City of Sunnyvale, Grijalva successfully negotiated the surrender of mass murderer Richard Farley in the ESL shootings, an event that triggered anti-stalking laws nationwide.  Grijalva was later portrayed by Richard Yniguez in the movie I Can Make You Love Me, which recounted the stalking of Laura Black.

Death of Raymond Zack Investigation
In 2011, Grijalva was contracted by the City of Alameda to conduct an investigation into the death of Raymond Zack, a mentally ill man who succumbed to hypothermia while standing in the waters off of Robert Crown Memorial Beach, while Alameda firefighters and police officers stood on the shore.

References

Wildfire suppression
Living people
Year of birth missing (living people)